How to $ell Your Wargame Design is a 1975 book written and published by Lou Zocchi.

Gameplay
How to $ell Your Wargame Design is a book that was written by professional designer Lou Zocchi with the intent to help other game designers get their games published.

Reception
Steve Jackson reviewed How to $ell Your Wargame in The Space Gamer No. 35. Schuessler commented that "On the whole, I recommend this book highly. I wish I'd seen it a year ago. If you ever intend to see a design professionally, order this one."

References

1975 non-fiction books
Wargaming books